|}

The Sefton Novices' Hurdle is a Grade 1 National Hunt hurdle race in Great Britain which is open to horses aged four years or older. It is run at Aintree over a distance of about 3 miles and half a furlong (4,964 metres), and during its running there are thirteen hurdles to be jumped. The race is for novice hurdlers, and it is scheduled to take place each year during the Grand National meeting in early April.

The event was established in 1988, and it was originally called the White Satin Novices' Hurdle. For a period it was classed at Grade 2 level. The race was given its present title in 1993, and it was promoted to Grade 1 status in 1995.

In recent years the Sefton Novices' Hurdle has usually featured horses which ran in the previous month's Spa Novices' Hurdle, and the last to achieve victory in both races was at Fishers Cross in 2013.

Records
<div style="font-size:90%">
Leading jockey (3 wins):
 Tony McCoy – Unsinkable Boxer (1998), Black Jack Ketchum (2006), At Fishers Cross (2013)
 Barry Geraghty – Sackville (2000), Iris's Gift (2003), Beat That (2014)

Leading trainer (4 wins):

 Nicky Henderson – Rustle (1988), Beat That (2014), Santini (2018), Champ (2019)</div>

Winners

See also
 Horse racing in Great Britain
 List of British National Hunt races
 Recurring sporting events established in 1988  – this race is included under its original title, White Satin Novices' Hurdle.References

 Racing Post:

 aintree.co.uk – 2010 John Smith's Grand National Media Guide.
 pedigreequery.com – Sefton Novices' Hurdle – Aintree''.

National Hunt races in Great Britain
Aintree Racecourse
National Hunt hurdle races
1988 establishments in England